Racemobambos is a genus of bamboo (tribe Bambuseae within the  Poaceae) and the sole genus of its subtribe, the Racemobambodinae. The genus is native to Indonesia, Malaysia, and Papuasia.

Species

References

Bambusoideae genera
Bambusoideae